Serrat Glacier is a glacier, 10 nautical miles (18 km) long, flowing north through the middle of Kavrayskiy Hills into the west side of Rennick Glacier. Mapped by United States Geological Survey (USGS) from surveys and U.S. Navy aerial photographs, 1960–62. Named by Advisory Committee on Antarctic Names (US-ACAN) for Javier Serrat of the University of Chile, who worked (electrical engineering) at the United States Antarctic Research Program (USARP) McMurdo Station, 1967–68.

References

Glaciers of Pennell Coast